In Chan and Zen Buddhism, dharma transmission is a custom in which a person is established as a "successor in an unbroken lineage of teachers and disciples, a spiritual 'bloodline' (kechimyaku) theoretically traced back to the Buddha himself." The dharma lineage reflects the importance of family-structures in ancient China, and forms a symbolic and ritual recreation of this system for the monastical "family".

In Rinzai-Zen, inka shōmei is ideally "the formal recognition of Zen's deepest realisation", but practically it is being used for the transmission of the "true lineage" of the masters (shike) of the training halls. There are only about fifty to eighty of such inka shōmei-bearers in Japan.

In Sōtō-Zen, dharma transmission is referred to as shiho, and further training is required to become an oshō.

History

The notion and practice of Dharma Transmission developed early in the history of Chan, as a means to gain credibility and to foster institutional ties among the members of the Chan community. Charts of dharma-lineages were developed, which represented the continuity of the Buddhist dharma. Originally these lineages only included the Chinese Patriarchs, but they were later extended to twenty-eight Indian Patriarchs and seven Buddhas.

Chan lineage

The Chan tradition developed from the established tradition of "Canonical Buddhism", which "remained normative for all later Chinese Buddhism". It was established by the end of the sixth century, as a result of the Chinese developing understanding of Buddhism in the previous centuries.

One of the inventions of this Canonical Buddhism were transmission lists, a literary device to establish a lineage. Both Tiantai and Chan took over this literary device, to lend authority to those developing traditions, and guarantee its authenticity:

The concept of dharma transmission took shape during the Tang period, when establishing the right teachings became important, to safeguard the authority of specific schools. The emerging Zen-tradition developed the Transmission of the Lamp-genre, in which lineages from Shakyamuni Buddha up to their own times were described.

Another literary device for establishing those traditions was given by the Kao-seng-chuan (Biographies of Eminent Monks), compiled around 530. The Chan-tradition developed its own corpus in this genre, with works such as Anthology of the Patriarchal Hall (952) and the Jingde Records of the Transmission of the Lamp (published 1004). McRae considers Dumoulin's A History of Zen to be a modern example of this genre, disguised as scientific history.

Chinese patriarchs

The Chan lineages picture the semi-legendary monk Bodhidharma as the patriarch who brought Chan to China. Only scarce historical information is available about him, but his hagiography developed when the Chan tradition grew stronger and gained prominence in the early 8th century.

Six Chinese patriarchs
By this time a lineage of the six ancestral founders of Chan in China was developed. In the late 8th century, under the influence of Huineng's student Shenhui, the traditional form of this lineage had been established:
 Bodhidharma ca. 440 – ca. 528
 Huike 487–593
 Sengcan ?–606
 Daoxin 580–651
 Hongren 601–674
 Huineng 638–713

Shenhui and Huineng
According to tradition, the sixth and last ancestral founder, Huineng (惠能; 638–713), was one of the giants of Chan history, and all surviving schools regard him as their ancestor. The dramatic story of Huineng's life tells that there was a controversy over his claim to the title of patriarch. After being chosen by Hongren, the fifth ancestral founder, Huineng had to flee by night to Nanhua Temple in the south to avoid the wrath of Hongren's jealous senior disciples.

Modern scholarship, however, has questioned this narrative. Historic research reveals that this story was created around the middle of the 8th century, beginning in 731 by Shenhui, a successor to Huineng, to win influence at the Imperial Court. He claimed Huineng to be the successor of Hongren instead of the then publicly recognized successor Shenxiu. In 745 Shenhui was invited to take up residence in the Ho-tse temple in Luoyang. In 753 he fell out of grace, and had to leave the capital to go into exile. The most prominent of the successors of his lineage was Guifeng Zongmi According to Zongmi, Shenhui's approach was officially sanctioned in 796, when "an imperial commission determined that the Southern line of Chan represented the orthodox transmission and established Shen-hui as the seventh patriarch, placing an inscription to that effect in the Shen-lung temple".

Doctrinally the Southern School is associated with the teaching that enlightenment is sudden, while the Northern School is associated with the teaching that enlightenment is gradual. This was a polemical exaggeration, since both schools were derived from the same tradition, and the so-called Southern School incorporated many teachings of the more influential Northern School. Eventually both schools died out, but the influence of Shenhui was so immense that all later Chan schools traced their origin to Huineng, and "sudden enlightenment" became a standard doctrine of Chan.

Indian Patriarchs
In later writings this lineage was extended to include twenty-eight Indian patriarchs. In the Song of Enlightenment (證道歌 Zhèngdào gē) of Yongjia Xuanjue (永嘉玄覺, 665–713), one of the chief disciples of Huìnéng, it is written that Bodhidharma was the 28th patriarch in a line of descent from Mahākāśyapa, a disciple of Śākyamuni Buddha, and the first patriarch of Chán Buddhism.

Twenty-eight Indian Patriarchs
Keizan's Transmission of the Light gives twenty-eight patriarchs up to and including Bodhidharma in this transmission:

Mahākāśyapa

According to the traditional Chan accounts, the first Dharma transmission occurred as described in the Flower Sermon. The Buddha held up a golden lotus flower before an assembly of "gods and men". None who were in attendance showed any sign of understanding except his disciple Mahākāśyapa, who offered only a smile. The Buddha then said,

Function
Though dharma transmission implies the acknowledgement of insight into the teachings of Buddhism as understood by the Zen tradition, especially seeing into one's true nature, dharma transmission is also a means to establish a person into the Zen tradition:

The dharma lineage reflects the importance of family-structures in ancient China, and forms a symbolic and ritual recreation of this system for the monastical "family".

Esoteric and exoteric transmission
According to Borup the emphasis on 'mind to mind transmission' is a form of esoteric transmission, in which "the tradition and the enlightened mind is transmitted face to face". Metaphorically this can be described as the transmission of a flame from one candle to another candle, or the transmission from one vein to another. In exoteric transmission the requirement is  "direct access to the teaching through a personal discovery of one's self. This type of transmission and identification is symbolized by the discovery of a shining lantern, or a mirror."

This polarity is recognizable in the emphasis that the Zen-tradition puts on maintaining the correct Dharma transmission, while simultaneously stressing seeing into one's nature:

Nevertheless, while the Zen tradition has always stressed the importance of formal Dharma transmission, there are well known examples of Mushi dokugo, such as Nōnin, Jinul and Suzuki Shōsan who attained awakening on their own, though all of them were familiair with the Zen-teachings.

Family structure
According to Bodiford, "Zen is the predominant form of Buddhism because of dharma transmission":

Bodiford distinguishes seven dimensions which are discernible in both family relationships and in dharma lineages:
 Ancestral dimension: "Ancestors (so) constitute a fundamental source of power". Performing rituals in honour of the ancestors keeps them in high regard "among the living".
 Biological dimension: the dharma lineage creates (spiritual) offspring, just as the family creates new life.
 Linguistic dimension: dharma heirs receive new names, which reflect their tie to the dharma 'family'.
 Ritual dimension: rituals confirm the family relationships. One's teacher is honored in rituals, as are deceased teachers.
 Legal dimension: teachers have the obligation to discipline their students, just as students have the obligation to obey their teachers.
 Institutional and financial dimension: dharma heirs have an obligation to support their home temple, both financially and ritually.
 Temporal dimension: long-term relationships foster the previous dimensions.

The family-model is easier recognized when East Asian languages are being used, because the same terminology is used to describe both earthly and spiritual family relations.

Dharma transmission is both concrete and abstract:

This feature gives dharma transmission a great flexibility:

Contemporary use in the Chan and Zen traditions
Within the various Chan and Zen traditions, dharma transmission got various meanings. A difference is made in most schools between

Chinese Chan
Traditional Chinese Chan still exists in China, Taiwan and Hong Kong, though it is less known in the west than Japanese Zen.

In the Chinese Buddhist tradition, there are 3 systems of transmission:
 Tonsure system: a person becomes tonsured as a novice monastic under the Master's school. He or she is given a Dharma name at the time of tonsure based on the Master's lineage. This name is also called "the outer name" because it is used by all people to address the novice. This name is used for life. At the same time, the Master will give the novice sramanera (or sramanerika) ten precepts.
 Ordination system: a novice will become fully ordained as a Bhikṣu monk or Bhikṣuni nun with the Triple Platform Ordination (Observing the Śrāmanera, Bhikṣu and Bodhisattva precepts). This ordination must be presided by ten senior monks with at least ten years of seniority with a pure practice in upholding the monastic precepts. In this ceremony, the ten witnessing masters represent the Triple Gem accepting the novice into the Sangha. At this time, another Dharma name is given. This name is called "precept name or inner name" because it is used only by one's Master. This name represents the novice's precept lineage transmission.
 Dharma transmission system: This system upholds the Treasury of the True Dharma Eye through the generations of transmission. This is the Mind-to-Mind seal of the Dharma that is beyond the scriptures. At this time, another Dharma name is given. This is also called "the inner name" and used only by one's Master. This name represents the novice's Dharma lineage transmission. After receiving this name, one will use this name instead of the name received during precept ordination to write one's Dharma name (Inner Name)(Outer Name).

It is customary to refer to one's own tonsure Master as "Gracious Master", precept Master as "Root Master" and Dharma transmission Master as "Venerable Master". In Chinese Buddhism, these 3 systems are separate and are not performed by the same Masters. Moreover, due to the strong emphasis on the Dharma, when a person receives Dharma transmission, he or she is recognized as that Chán Master's Dharma son or daughter. Lay Buddhists may also receive this Dharma transmission, but this is very rare and with very few incidences. Most of the monks and nuns who received transmission have already been tonsured and ordained by other Masters.

Rinzai

All Rinzai lineages pass through Hakuin Ekaku, the 18th century revivalist, who considered himself to be an heir of Shoju Rojin (Shoju Ronin, Dokyu Etan, 1642–1721), though Hakuin never received formal dharma transmission from Shoju Rojin, nor from any other teacher. When he was installed as head priest of Shōin-ji in 1718, he had the title of Dai-ichiza, "First Monk":

All contemporary Rinzai-lineages stem from Inzan Ien (1751–1814) and Takuju Kosen (1760–1833), both students of Gasan Jito (1727–1797). Gasan is considered to be a dharma heir of Hakuin, though "he did not belong to the close circle of disciples and was probably not even one of Hakuin's dharma heirs".

Through Hakuin, all contemporary Japanese Rinzai-lineages are part of the Ōtōkan lineage, brought to Japan in 1267 by Nanpo Jomyo, who received dharma transmission in China in 1265.

Insight and succession
In the Rinzai school, a difference is made between acknowledgement of insight and succession in the organisation:

According to Mohr, 

The most common form of transmission in Rinzai Zen is the acknowledgement that one has stayed in the monastery for a certain amount of time, and may later become a temple priest.

Further practice
After finishing koan-study, further practice is necessary:

Inka shōmei
Common transmission does not include inka shōmei. Ideally inka shōmei is "the formal recognition of Zen's deepest realisation", but practically it is being used for transmission of the "true lineage" of the masters (shike) of the training halls. Training halls are temples which are authorised for further training after being qualified as a temple priest.

There are only about fifty to eighty such inka shōmei-bearers in Japan:

According to roshi Sokun Tsushimoto, the title of roshi is equivalent to Zen master and shike:

A qualified Zen master bestows inka only upon "those select few" who have successfully completed the entire Rinzai koan curriculum, and "are eligible to serve as sōdō roshi, that is, master of a training hall, in distinction from a common temple:

According to roshi Sokun Tsushimoto,

 (Korean: Inga) literally means "the legitimate seal of clearly furnished proof": 

The right-hand portion of the seal was given to an individual who would then work by authority of the emperor, while the emperor himself would retain the left-hand portion. In ancient times inka usually came in the form of an actual document, but this practice is no longer commonplace.

Sōtō
In Sōtō, dharma transmission is the acknowledgement of the ties between teacher and student. It has been subject to changes over the history of the Sōtō-school.

Though Dōgen emphasized the importance of the purity of the teachings, and highly valued lineage and dharma transmission, the Sōtō-school has its origins in various lineages and dharma transmissions. Dogen received dharma transmission from his Chinese teacher Rujing, with whom he studied two years, but in medieval Sōtō he was also considered to be a dharma heir of Myōzen, a Rinzai-teacher, with whom he studied eight years. And Tettsū Gikai, the dharma-grandson of Dogen, was also lineage-holder of Nōnin, the founder of the Dharuma-shu, also a Rinzai-school. Gikai passed this lineage over to Keizan, who thereby was also lineage-holder in at least two lineages.

To make the history of Sōtō even more complicated, the Caodong-lineage that Dogen inherited through Rujing was passed on previously from the Caodong-master Dayang Jingxuan to Touzi Yiqing via the Rinzai-master Fushan Fayuan. Fushan Fayuan had once studied under Dayang Jingxuan. When Jingxuan died Fayuan had received Jingxuan's "portrait, robe, and a verse that expressed his teaching", promising "to pass them on to a suitable successor". Fayuan chose his student Touzi Yiqing to inherit this lineage, a fact that was acknowledged in Keizan's Denkoroku, but "[i]n the standard versions of Dogen's writings, however, all direct references to Yiqing's indirect succession have been eliminated".

Criteria
Manzan Dokahu (1636–1714), a Sōtō reformer,

According to Manzan, even an unenlightened student could receive dharma transmission:

In Sōtō-zen, since Manzan Dokahu, two criteria are applied for dharma transmission:
 Isshi inshō – "Exclusive authentication from no more than one teacher". This criterion "prohibits clerics inheriting more than one lineage"
 Menju shihō – "Face-to-face bestowal of succession". This criterion "prohibits conferral by proxy, conferral at a distance to strangers, or posthumous conferral".

Status
In contrast to the status that dharma transmission has begotten in the west, in Sōtō it has a relatively low status:

To supervise the training of monks, further qualifications are necessary:

The duties which come with this full qualification were not always appreciated. In the medieval organisation of the Sōtō-shu, when rotation of abbotship was the norm. Dharma transmission at a branch temple obliged one to serve at least one term as abbot at the main temple. Abbotship gave severe duties, and financial burdens, for which reason many tried to avoid the responsibility of abbotship:

Spiritual realization
The Sōtō-shu also confers inka shōmyō (or inshō) "[granting] the seal of approval to a realization of enlightenment", upon students. This is an 

Dharma transmission is part of the maintenance of the Sōtō-institutions. Authority and temple-property are handed down, often from father to son. It is not a guarantee for spiritual attainment:

Shiho
Dharma transmission is also called shiho. In the Sōtō school a student receives Dharma transmission during a denbō ceremony, which is the last ceremony of their shiho ceremony: 

Muhō Noelke, the German-born former abbot of the temple Antai-ji, describes his understanding of shiho:

Shiho is done "one-to-one in the abbot's quarters (hojo)". Three handwritten documents certify the dharma transmission;

The procedure has to take place only once in one's life, and binds the student to the teacher forever:

If a students does not have the feeling he wants to be tied to this teacher for the rest of his life, he may refuse to take dharma transmission from this particular teacher. Since the time of Manzan Dokahu (1636–1714), multiple dharma transmissions are impossible in Sōtō Zen.

Further study
According to Muho Noelke, dharma transmission marks the beginning of the real learning:

After Dharma transmission one has become a member of the "blood line" of Zen, but is not yet qualified as an Oshō. After the ten-e and zuise ceremonies, one is qualified as an oshō. There-after one has to practice for some time, at least six months, in an sôdô-ango, an officially recognized Sōtō-shu training centre.

After that one can start to work in a temple. The newly acquired status is confirmed in the kyoshi-honin ceremony. There-after follows the first practice-period in one's own temple, with the aid of a susho (head monk). This is followed by the Jushoku-himei ceremony, which confirms one's status as dai-oshō.

Sanbo Kyodan
The Sanbo Kyodan mixes Sōtō and Rinzai-elements. Students in this school follow the Harada-Yasutani koan curriculum, in which great emphasis is placed on kensho, the initial insight into one's true nature. Having attained kensho is publicly acknowledged in a jahai-ceremony. After working through the Harada-Yasutani koan curriculum, which may take as short as five years, the student receives a calligraphy testifying that he or she "has finished the great matter". This is publicly acknowledged in the hasansai-ceremony, giving the status of hasan.

The Sanbo Kyodan has two levels of teaching authority, namely junshike ("associate zen master"), and shōshike ("authentic zen master"). Junshikes can give dokusan, authorize kensho, and supervise part of the koan-study. Shoshikes can supervise the advanced koan-study, and perform religious ceremonies, such as the precept-ceremony and wedding ceremonies.

The process toward gaining these titles has seen some variations within the Sanbo Kyodan. Hasansai may be preparatory to the junshike-title, but may also be the promotion to this title. And promotion to shoshike may be preparatory to dharma transmission, but may also be equivalent to it.

In dharma transmission, the student receives the sanmotsu, akin to the Sōtō shiho ceremony. This is coupled with the Rinzai notion on inka. In Rinzai, only students who have completed the complete Rinzai koan curriculum and "are eligible to serve as sōdō roshi, that is, master of a training hall, in distinction from a common temple, receive inka. In the Sanbo Kyodan, inka is derived from Harada's Rinzai master Dokutan Sōsan.

White Plum Asanga

In the White Plum Asanga, Dharma transmission comes first, and qualifies one as a sensei. This may be followed by inka, the final acknowledgemment:

Korean Soen
In Korean Soen, Inka (In'ga) typically refers to the private acknowledgement of dharma transmission from a teacher to their student. "Transmission" is used to refer to the public ceremonial version of the same acknowledgement.

Both are considered equal in authority and "realization". A monk with either In'ga or the public "transmission" is qualified to hold the post of Soen Sa (seonsa;), or "Zen Master" for a temple, and give transmission to their own students (either, In'ga or public "transmission"). The majority of Zen Masters in Korea have only received, and only give In'ga, with the formal transmission ceremony being far more rare.

In the Western Kwan Um School of Zen created by the Korean Zen Master Seung Sahn, "Inka" is granted to an individual who has completed their koan training and is granted the title Ji Do Poep Sa Nim (jido beopsa-nim;). Dharma transmission in the Kwan Um School of Zen comes after inka, denoting the individual is now a Soen Sa Nim. Seung Sahn himself is quoted saying in reference to the administration of his Western organization,

Vietnamese Thiền
Thích Nhất Hạnh has created a ritual known as "Lamp Transmission", making a teacher a dharmācārya—an individual with "limited teaching authority." According to author James Ishmael Ford,

Criticism
In the western understanding, dharma transmission stands solely for recognition of authentic insight, whereas in the Japanese monastery system dharma transmission is a formal notification that someone is fully qualified to take a leading role in this system. In the USA and Europe dharma transmission is linked to the unofficial title roshi, older teacher. In the Western understanding roshis are "part of a tradition that imputes to them quasi-divine qualities", someone who "is defined by simplicity, innocence, and lack of self-interest or desire". Nevertheless, the authorisation of teachers through dharma transmission does not mean that teachers are infallible, as is clear from the repeated appearance of scandals:

According to Stuart Lachs, those scandals have also been possible because of the status given to roshis by dharma transmission, and "a desire for the master’s aura, recognition, and approval":

See also
 Mushi dokugo
 Lineage (Buddhism)
 Zen ranks and hierarchy

In other religions
 Apostolic succession
 Guru-shishya tradition
 Isnad
 Parampara
 Silsila
 Semikhah

Notes

References

Web-references

Sources

Further reading

Historiography

Contemporary practice

External links 
 Roshi and His Teachers, Dharma Transmission,and the Rochester Zen Center Lineage Roshi Bodhin Kjolhede discusses lineage and Dharma transmission.
 Coming Down from the Zen Clouds:A Critique of the Current State of American Zen Stuart Lachs criticizes Dharma transmission in Zen
 Dharma Transmission & Succession, A Sweeping Zen Roundtable Discussion (Podcast) Erik Storlie, Myoan Grace Schireson and Eshu Martin discuss Dharma transmission & succession
 Sweeping Zen: Inka shomei
 Married monks?
 Erik Fraser Storlie: Lineage Delusions: Eido Shimano Roshi, Dharma Transmission, and American Zen
 Muho Noelke: What does it take to become a full-fledged Sōtō-shu priest and is it really worth the whole deal? Part 1 – 2 – 3 – 4 – 5 – 6 – 7 – 8 – 9 – 10
 The Formation of Soto Zen Priests in the West, A Dialogue
 James Ishmael Ford: Bodhisattva Ordination, Leadership Reform, and the Role of Zen Clerics in Japan
 Interview with Mel Weitsman
 Jeffrey S. Brooks, On Self-Ordination, taking the title Sotapanna (Stream Winner), beginning a new Vehicle of Buddhism and Using the Buddha's terminology for hierarchy within that new vehicle

Buddhist philosophical concepts
Zen Buddhist philosophical concepts